Eight National Olympic Committees could have a maximum of three eligible athletes per event, all other NOCs could have a maximum of two eligible athletes per event. Here follows the detailed attribution of the qualification places:

Notes and references
Notes

 China achieved qualification for the women's event through the ITU Olympic Qualification Ranking, therefore the host nation's Olympic place was given to another best placed athlete in the ITU Olympic Qualification Rankings;
 Oceanian NOCs did not qualify any eligible male and female competitors through the Continental Olympic Ranking; the same situation was verified with African NOCs for the women's event. Thus, each of these qualification places were given to the next best placed athletes in the ITU Olympic Qualification Rankings;
 Flora Duffy would qualify through her place in the ITU Olympic Qualification Ranking. Since she received an invitation from the tripartite commission, her slot was given to the next best placed athlete in the ITU Olympic Qualification Rankings.

References

Qualification for the 2008 Summer Olympics
Qualification for the 2008 Summer Olympics
Triathlon at the 2008 Summer Olympics